José Manuel Prieto is a Cuban novelist, translator and scholar.

Biography 
José Manuel Prieto was born in Havana, Cuba in 1962. He earned his PhD in History in Universidad Nacional Autónoma de México and has taught at the Centro de Investigación y Docencia Económica, Mexico City, from 1994 to 2004. In 2004–2005 he was the Margaret and Herman Sokol Fellow at The Dorothy and Lewis B. Cullman Center for Scholars and Writers in The New York Public Library. Prieto has been the recipient of fellowships, grants and awards from Sistema Nacional de Creadores, México, January 2003 – 2005 the Santa Madalena Foundation, April del 2001, Florencia and John Simon Guggenheim Memorial Foundation (2002)

Prieto's books have been translated into English, French, German, Norwegian, Italian and Russian and are available through a number of prominent publishing houses, including Grove Press, Suhrkamp, Anagrama, Christian Bourgois, Время and Faber and Faber  .

Prieto has translated poems by Anna Akhmatova, and Josef Brodsky, as well as prose by Andrey Platonov, Vladimir Mayakovsky, Alexander Solzhenitsyn, and Vladimir Nabokov.

Prieto has lived in New York City since 2004. He teaches literature at Seton Hall University.

Works

Novels
 Enciclopedia de una vida en Rusia''' Barcelona: Mondadori, 2003.
 Livadia Barcelona: Mondadori, 1999.
 Nocturnal Butterflies of the Russian Empire (Livadia), New York: Atlantic Monthly Press, 2000
 Rex . Spain,: Anagrama, 2007.

Other works
 Nunca antes habias visto el rojo Cuba, 1995.
 Trenta días en Moscú Barcelona: Mondadori, 2001.
 El tartamudo y la rusa Mexico: Tusquets 2002.
 Die Kubanische Revolution und wie erkläre ich sie meinem Taxifahrer'', edition suhrkamp 2559, Broschur, 218 Seiten

References

External links
The New York Review Of Books,  "Havana: The State Retreats"
The New York Review of Books  "Reading Mandelstam on Stalin"
The Nation, "Travels by Taxi: Reflections on Cuba", 2009 
The Nation, "Puttin' on the Glitz: José Manuel Prieto's Rex"
PEN World Voices Festival, New York, 2005. Biography
The international literature festival, Berlin, 2003  Biography

Cuban male novelists
1962 births
Living people
Postmodern writers